Anu Kaal (born  Anu Kindlam, 4 November 1940 Tallinn) is an Estonian coloratura soprano singer. In 2001, she was awarded the Order of the White Star.

Life 
She studied at the Tallinna Muusikakool, and Estonian Academy of Music and Theatre. She studied at La Scala, with Renata Carosio.

From 1967 to 1996, she was an opera soloist. She sang with Georg Ots. Since 1984, she has taught at the Estonian Academy of Music and Theatre.

Kaal has been the partner of ballet dancer and actor Väino Aren since 1986.

References 

1940 births
Living people
Singers from Tallinn
20th-century Estonian women opera singers
Estonian operatic sopranos
Estonian Academy of Music and Theatre alumni
Academic staff of the Estonian Academy of Music and Theatre
Recipients of the Order of the White Star, 3rd Class